The Finnish Landrace, Finn or Finnsheep is a breed of domestic sheep native to Finland. It is one of several Northern European short-tailed sheep breeds, but is notable for its high incidence of multiple births – it is common for a ewe to have three, four, or even five lambs at once.

The lambs are often small, but are vigorous at birth and grow well.  The lambs mature early and can be mated at six months of age.  Ewes commonly breed out of season and some may lamb twice in a year. The breed belongs to the group of Northern European short-tailed sheep, which also includes Shetland, Icelandic, Romanov, Spaelsau, and several other breeds.

The Finnsheep is often used in crossbreeding programs to increase lambing percentage, and Finnsheep blood is found in many of the newer breeds.

Characteristics

Wool 
The fineness of Finnsheep wool has some individual variation, but the American Sheep Industry’s Wool Council ranks Finnsheep in the fine end of the medium wool category.  The wool has a soft handle, a moderate crimp and a high luster.

Finnsheep have a similar range of fleece colors to that of Shetland and Icelandic sheep.  White is genetically dominant and the most common color. Black and black piebald (spotted) sheep are also fairly common, while brown, grey and fawn Finnsheep are very scarce in the USA. Markings such as white stockings, tail tips, white crown or facial markings including the panda-like eyespot pattern, are common in colored Finnsheep.

Australian Finns are universally white; the wool has superior length, softness, better radius of curvature and reduced prickle factor. In Australia, wool quality and length have improved greatly to the extent that there are now sheep which can be shorn twice per year and whose advantageous wool characteristics have been extensively incorporated into the Merino flock.

Meat
Although not a large sheep, Finns produce a lean, succulent meat with a delicate and mild flavor, even as adults.

Fertility 
Finnsheep mature early and are known for their fertility. Rams can be bred at four to eight months of age, and ewes are expected to lamb at twelve months with multiple lambs.  Although twins and triplets are most common, there have been litters born with as many as seven viable lambs.

United States

Finnsheep were first brought to North America by the University of Manitoba, CA in 1966. A few years later, Finnsheep made their way down into the US by enthusiasts who hoped to improve maternal qualities in commercial flocks.  By 1971, The Finnsheep Breeders Association had formed, providing shepherds with a standard of documentation to maintain and improve the integrity of the breed. 

Currently, there are two recognized registries in the US for Finnsheep: the FBA (Finnsheep Breeders Association) and the IFR (International Finnsheep Registry).

Australia

The breed was brought to Australia in two main importations: by the University of NSW in 1981 and by the Australian Texel Corporation in 1993. Considerable breeding efforts have since been undertaken to develop the strain to be better suited to the Australian climate. Lamb size and survival rates have increased. Typical litter sizes are three or four lambs. Further improving mothering, milk yield, and hardiness in paddock conditions, are the primary goals of the breeding program.

The breed has been used extensively for crossbreeding to produce sheep with various desirable characteristics, but particularly leanness, better wool production and improved fertility and fecundity (more lambs) and excellent "doing" ability. An important feature of Finnsheep is their thin, wrinkle-free skin and bare breech. This means Finn-cross sheep are much less susceptible to flystrike than Merinos and do not require mulesing, a contentious operation intended to reduce the incidence of flystrike. Their skins produce more better-quality wool, as well as superior leather.

Australian Finns (and particularly Finn crosses) are extraordinarily lean and have contributed greatly to an improvement in the leanness of first- and second-cross lambs. They are also more resistant to intestinal parasites than many other breeds, and to a range of other problems such as pregnancy toxaemia ("twin lamb disease"), coccidiosis, and facial eczema.

The most common cross in Australia is the Finn-Merino. Many flocks have achieved lamb survival rates over 180% and twice a year shearing of high quality wool from large flocks (1,000 + sheep per flock) of this cross. Other numerically important crosses include Finn-Dorsets and Finn-Texels. The Finnsheep is having a significant effect on improving average productivity of Australian flocks.

References

External links
 International Finnsheep Registry 
 The US Finnsheep Breeders Association
 Australian Finnsheep
 Finnsheep Registry in Finland

Sheep breeds originating in Finland
Sheep breeds